Logic Express was a "light" version of Logic Pro, a MIDI sequencer and digital audio workstation software application maintained by Apple that runs on the Mac OS X platform. It was announced on January 15, 2004, for release in March 2004.

Logic Pro and Express shared most functionality and the same interface. Logic Express was limited to two-channel stereo mixdown, while Logic Pro can handle multichannel surround sound; Logic Express also lacked support for TDM/DAE systems, high-end control surfaces and Distributed Audio Processing. Both could handle up to 255 audio tracks, depending on system performance (CPU, hard disk throughput and seek time). Logic Express 8 came with 36 software instruments and 73 effect plug-ins, including almost all of those in the Logic Pro Package. Those that it didn't include are Sculpture, a physical modelling synthesiser; the "vintage" instruments (the EVB3 tonewheel organ, the EVD6 Clavinet and the EVP88 Electric Piano), however a cut-down version of these are included with the GarageBand instruments; Space designer, a convolution reverb effect; and delay designer, an advanced delay effect.

Logic Express was discontinued in 2011, when Logic Pro moved to the Mac App Store for $199.99.

See also
 Logic Studio
 Logic Pro
 Logic Control
 Audio Units
 Core Audio

References 
 Apple Computer, Inc. (2004b). Apple streamlines professional audio product line: introduces Logic Pro 6 & Logic Express 6. Retrieved January 16, 2004.
 Sharma, D. C. (2004). Apple polishes musical offerings. In Personal tech. Retrieved January 16, 2004.

External links
Official Logic Pro home page

MIDI
Digital audio workstation software
MacOS-only software made by Apple Inc.